Rossia bullisi, also known as the Gulf bobtail squid, is a species of bobtail squid native to the tropical western Atlantic Ocean, specifically the northern Gulf of Mexico and Straits of Florida.

R. bullisi grows to 45 mm in mantle length.

The type specimen was collected in the Gulf of Mexico and is deposited at the National Museum of Natural History in Washington, D.C.

References

External links

Bobtail squid
Molluscs of North America
Molluscs of the Atlantic Ocean
Fauna of the Southeastern United States
Molluscs described in 1956